Haraç  was a land tax levied on non-Muslims in the Ottoman Empire.

Haraç was developed from an earlier form of land taxation, kharaj (harac), and was, in principle, only payable by non-Muslims; it was seen as a counterpart to zakat paid by Muslims. The haraç system later merged into the cizye taxation system. While the taxes collected from non Muslims were higher than those collected from Muslims, the rights and opportunities provided to non Muslims were much more limited. It often incentivised people to convert to Islam. 

Haraç collection was reformed by a firman of 1834, which abolished the old levying system, and required that haraç be raised by a commission composed of the kadı and the ayans, or municipal chiefs of rayas in each district. The firman made several other changes to taxation.

References

Sources

Taxation in the Ottoman Empire
Christianity in the Ottoman Empire
History of taxation
Disabilities (Jewish)
Zakat